The Mill, also known as The Manchester Mill, is an online newspaper covering Greater Manchester.

Launched in June 2020, The Mill publishes one in-depth article via email and the web daily to paying members and a weekly digest email to those who subscribe for free. During its first year of operation it has gained more than 1,000 paying members and over 13,000 subscribers to its free mailing list.

The publication is primarily funded by subscription revenue, and, since October 2022, is financially self-sustaining. It has also received a grant from its hosting platform, Substack, the only UK-based publication to receive a grant from its programme, allowing it to set up two sister publications in other Northern cities: The Tribune in Sheffield, and The Post in Liverpool.

On 14 December 2021 a 56 page physical paper edition of The Mill was published, with 15,000 copies being distributed in Manchester city centre.

References

External links
 

Newspapers published in Manchester
Newspapers established in 2020
Daily newspapers published in the United Kingdom
2020 establishments in England